OMY or omy may refer to:
 Thbeng Meanchey Airport, the IATA code OMY
 ISO 639:omy, the ISO 639 code for the Old Malay